Phillack is a village (and formerly a parish) in west Cornwall, England, United Kingdom. It is about one mile (1.6 km) northeast of Hayle and half-a-mile (0.8 km) inland from St Ives Bay on Cornwall's Atlantic ocean coast. The village is separated from the sea by a range of high sand dunes known as The Towans.

Phillack has been in the civil parish of Hayle since 1935; before that it was a separate parish in its own right. Phillack parish was originally in Redruth Registration District but the village now comes under Camborne-Redruth Registration District.

There is some dispute over the origins of the name. In the 17th century, Phillack was believed to refer to the Irish Saint Felicitas who is said to have founded Phillack church in the 6th century. However, a 10th-century Vatican codex mentions a Saint Felec of Cornwall who is believed to have lived about the same time and may be dedicatee of the parish church

Parish church

St Felicitas and St Piala's Church, Phillack was originally the parish church also of Hayle: it was built in the 15th century and rebuilt in 1856 by William White but the tower is original. It is part of the Godrevy Team Ministry  The font is probably not medieval; half a coped stone is in the churchyard. There were over a 160 year period from 1763 to 1922 four rectors of Phillack belonging to the Hockin family: William (1763-1809), William (1809-1853), Frederick (1853-1902) and Arthur (1902-1922), probably unique among English parishes.

Antiquities
Two early stones have been found embedded in the original village church. One bears a 'Constantine' form of a Chi-Rho cross which may date to the 5th century; it was afterwards rebuilt into the wall directly above the apex of the arch of the doorway of the new church. The second is simple memorial stone bearing the name of "Clo[tualus] [son of] Mo[bra]ttus", dated between the fifth to eighth centuries, and now stands in the churchyard. Arthur G. Langdon (1896) recorded the existence of six stone crosses in the parish, including two in the churchyard. The others were at Copperhouse, at Bodriggy, in a field and in the rectory garden.

References and footnotes

External links

Phillack Church website

Villages in Cornwall
Populated coastal places in Cornwall
Hayle
Penwith